The Filet-O-Fish is a fish sandwich (or burger) sold by the international fast food restaurant chain McDonald's.  It was created in 1962 by Lou Groen, a McDonald's franchise owner in Cincinnati, Ohio, in response to falling hamburger sales on Fridays resulting from the Western Christian practice of abstaining from meat on Fridays, which plays an important role in Roman Catholicism, Methodism and Anglicanism. While the fish composition of the sandwich has changed through the years to satisfy taste and address supply shortcomings, the framework of its ingredients have remained constant; a fried breaded fish fillet, a steamed bun, tartar sauce and pasteurized American cheese.

History
The sandwich was invented in 1962 by Catholic businessman Lou Groen, a McDonald's franchise owner in Cincinnati; his store at 5425 West North Bend Road was in a predominantly Roman Catholic neighborhood, which led to falling hamburger sales on Fridays resulting from the Roman Catholic practice of abstaining from meat on Fridays, a Western Christian custom also practiced by many Methodists, Anglicans and Lutherans. The product was named by Cye Landy of Cye Landy Advertising Agency, which was the advertising firm for that particular McDonald's franchise.

The sandwich was the first non-hamburger menu item brought in by new McDonald's company owner Ray Kroc. Kroc made a deal with Groen: they would sell two non-meat sandwiches on a Friday, Kroc's own Hula Burger (grilled pineapple with cheese on a cold bun) and the Filet-O-Fish, and whichever sold the most would be added to the permanent menu. The Filet-O-Fish "won hands down" and was added to menus throughout 1963 until reaching nationwide status in 1965.

The use of farmed fish in the Filet-O-Fish first came about in 1981, when an owner of a New Zealand fisheries company was dissatisfied with the pollock Filet-O-Fish he purchased at the Courtenay Place, Wellington restaurant. Saying to the manager that he could make a better-tasting fish fillet, he was handed a box of fillets and told to come back with identical, better-tasting fillets. He substituted red cod for the pollock, and after the manager was satisfied with the better-tasting red cod fillets, ended up in agreement to supply the Courtenay Place restaurant (and eventually several other New Zealand restaurants) with the red cod fillets. The similar-tasting hoki was substituted several years later, due to its competitive market value and its boneless fillets, and eventually was introduced widely in the early 1990s when global pollock stocks were facing low numbers.

McDonald's removed the Filet-O-Fish from its menus in the United States on September 26, 1996, and replaced it with the Fish Filet Deluxe sandwich, which was part of McDonald's ill-fated Deluxe line of sandwiches. However, the Filet-O-Fish was brought back to its menus on a gradual basis starting in the middle of 1997, due to overwhelming letters and petitions, receiving the larger fish patty from the Fish Filet Deluxe. The Fish Filet Deluxe itself was discontinued at most restaurants early in 1998, while others continued to offer it until 2000, when it was finally removed from all McDonald's menus.

In November 2007, McDonald's lowered the use of New Zealand hoki and increased the use of Alaska pollock, due to declining New Zealand hoki fishery sustainability and large cutbacks in the total allowable commercial catch of hoki by the New Zealand Ministry of Fisheries - from 250,000 tonnes in 1997 to 90,000 tonnes in 2007. McDonald's originally used Atlantic cod, before declining cod catches forced McDonald's to find sustainable fish elsewhere. McDonald's is trying to maintain fish only from areas certified as sustainable by the Marine Stewardship Council, but that is becoming more difficult each year. Hoki is still a major ingredient.

As of March 2009, the Marine Stewardship Council placed the Alaska pollock fisheries in a re-assessment program due to catch numbers declining by over 30% between 2005 and 2008, and by-catch problems with salmon.

As of January 2013, the Marine Stewardship Council stated that the pollock comes from suppliers with sustainable fishing practices, and McDonald's packaging and promotion will reflect that change.

In 2019, McDonald's sent a cease-and-desist letter to a small Canadian restaurant that was selling a fish sandwich it called the 'Effing Filet O' Fish'. McDonald's claimed that the restaurant's use of that term violated McDonald's registered 'Filet-O-Fish' trademark. In response, the restaurant agreed to stop using 'Filet O' Fish' to describe its fish sandwich.

Product description
The fish used for the Filet-O-Fish patty in various markets is as follows:
 United States — , contains a battered, fried fish fillet made from Alaska pollock.
 Republic of Ireland —  either hoki or Alaska pollock may be served.
 United Kingdom — , contains white Hoki or Pollock fish in crispy breadcrumbs.
 New Zealand — Contains hoki instead of Alaska pollock.

Half a slice of cheese is used in each Filet-O-Fish sandwich, with McDonald's stating the reason as to prevent the cheese from overwhelming the taste.

A Double Filet-O-Fish is available in some regions.

Society and culture 
The Filet-O-Fish is often referred to as a burger outside the U.S, in particular in Australia, India, New Zealand, and the UK.

Religious observation 
The Filet-O-Fish, originally created for Western Christians observing the Friday Fast, remains popularly associated with this community, with US sales significantly rising around Lent. The practice has inspired other fast food chains to offer seafood options during Lent.

This sandwich is also popular around Jewish and Muslim communities due to its ingredients being more aligned with kashrut and halal rules than McDonald's other offerings. The sandwich contains fish, milk in the cheese, and egg yolks in the sauce. In addition, the fish patty is cooked in a separate frypot to avoid giving other items a fishy taste. Certification-wise, the sandwich is certified as halal in the UAE and a few other Muslim-majority countries; it is also available in kosher-supervised restaurants of McDonald's Israel. However, not all Israeli locations are certified and stores in the UK and the US participate in no certification.

Variants 

In France, a variation of the sandwich is sold as the "McFish," using the "Mc-" prefix that McDonald's uses for some of its other products. The French McFish does not include cheese and replaces tartar sauce with ketchup.

See also
 Fish finger sandwich
 List of halal and kosher fish

References

External links

Filetofish.com 

McDonald's foods
Products introduced in 1962
Fish dishes
American sandwiches
Seafood sandwiches